Joseph-Georges-Philippe Laurin (9 July 1892 – 6 October 1964) was a Conservative member of the House of Commons of Canada. He was born in Montreal, Quebec and became a notary.

Laurin attended Saint-Laurent College, then the Université de Montréal where he earned his Bachelor of Laws degree. He became a school commissioner of Saint-Laurent in 1927 and became president of that commission in July 1929. He was particularly interested in sports and was a member of the Canadian team to an international event at Nancy, France in 1911.

He was first elected to Parliament at the Jacques Cartier riding in the 1930 general election. After serving his only term, the 17th Canadian Parliament, Laurin was defeated by Vital Mallette of the Liberal party in the 1935 federal election.

Electoral record

References

External links
 

1892 births
1964 deaths
Members of the House of Commons of Canada from Quebec
Conservative Party of Canada (1867–1942) MPs
People from Montreal
Université de Montréal alumni